Radu Albot was the defending champion but chose not to defend his title.

Alexey Vatutin won the title after defeating Guido Andreozzi 2–6, 7–6(12–10), 6–3 in the final.

Seeds

Draw

Finals

Top half

Bottom half

External Links
Main Draw
Qualifying Draw

Poznań Open - Singles
2017 Singles